Nižná Boca is a village and municipality in Liptovský Mikuláš District in the Žilina Region of northern Slovakia.

History 
In historical records the village was first mentioned in 1285. Nižná Boca Village is situated on both banks of the river Boca. It is surrounded by nearby mountains. The area is situated in a protected area in the Low Tatras National Park.

Near the village are meadows and small rolls. The soil is poor. Potatoes are often harvested as much as inflicted. Under difficult circumstances, planted crops grown are exposed to severe weather conditions.

The population was addressed mainly to cattle and sheep. A special feature is a rarity, even the fact that citizens have cattle for short time next to their homes, as well as directly on grassland in special loghouses - meadow stables. About 50 of these meadow stables can be seen scattered throughout the valley. Some are still functional and in good condition. Efforts is currently underway to rescue the stables.
 
Vyšná Boca is a little, originally a mining village (altitude 950 m), at the end of the Bocianska dolina (Stork Valley) below Čertovica and Rovná hoľa. It is situated in the Protected Area of the Low Tatras National Park (NAPANT) and is an excellent starting point for the hikes to the Ďumbierske and Kráľovohorské Tatras. In the middle of the 19th century, the village was separated from the former villages Kráľovská and Svätojánska Boca. Meantime it was an administrative part of Nižná Boca. In the past, iron, gold and antimony were mined here, later the inhabitants dealt with agriculture, work in woods and stock-raising. The mining past reminds a chain of big mining houses with courtyard galleries shifting now to holiday cottages. In the village, there is a tolerant church from the year 1785, built at foundations of an older one.

Geography 
The municipality lies at an altitude of 851 metres and covers an area of 25.172 km². It has a population of about 178 people.

References

External links 

Villages and municipalities in Liptovský Mikuláš District